Mangelia dobsoni is a species of sea snail, a marine gastropod mollusk in the family Mangeliidae.

This is a taxon inquirendum.

Description
The figure published by Grabau and King is remarkably similar to the figure published by Dunker in 1860 as Mangelia costulata (Dunker, 1860) and now with the accepted name Mangelia dunkeri Kuroda, 1961

Distribution
This marine species occurs off China.

References

 Grabau, A. W. & S. G. King, 1928f, Shells of Peitaiho, 2nd ed. Peking Society of Natural History, Hand-Book No. 2: vi + 279 + [1 – Errata] pp., 11 pls.

External links
  Tucker, J.K. 2004 Catalog of recent and fossil turrids (Mollusca: Gastropoda). Zootaxa 682:1-1295.
 Coan, Eugene V., et al. "The molluscan taxa of AW Grabau & SG King (1928) and their types." Malacologia 58.1–2 (2015): 179-224.

÷

dobsoni
Gastropods described in 1928